Wang Fei (born 6 June 1989) is a male Chinese footballer, who plays as a winger or midfielder for Chinese club Yuxi Yukun.

Club career
Wang Fei would start his professional football career for top tier side Changsha Ginde during the 2009 Chinese Super League season and would make his league debut on September 12, 2009 against Dalian Shide in a 1–1 draw. By the end of the season Wang Fei would make a further thirteen appearances and go on to establish himself as a regular squad member within the team, however at the end of the following 2010 Chinese Super League season Changsha Ginde were relegated and Wang Fei was allowed to leave the club. Without a club Wang Fei would decide to train with Changchun Yatai and Austrian side SR Donaufeld Wien before going on a training session at Shanghai Shenhua before the start of the 2012 Chinese Super League campaign where he had a successful trial and was offered a contract form the top tier club.
In June 2015, Wang was loaned to China League One side Nei Mongol Zhongyou until 31 December 2015. He was sent to the Shenhua reserved team in 2016.

On 6 February 2018, Wang transferred to China League One side Qingdao Huanghai. He would make his debut in a league game on 11 March 2018 against Dalian Transcendence where he came on as a substitute in a 4-2 victory. This was soon followed with his first start for the club on 4 April 2018 in a league game against Heilongjiang Lava Spring, which ended in a 3-0 victory and his first goal for the club. By the following season Wang had become an integral member of the squad and he would help the team to win the 2019 China League One division and promotion into the top tier.

Career statistics 
Statistics accurate as of match played 31 December 2020.

Honours

Club
Qingdao Huanghai
China League One: 2019

References

External links

1989 births
Chinese footballers
Footballers from Liaoning
Living people
Chinese Super League players
China League One players
China League Two players
Changsha Ginde players
Shanghai Shenhua F.C. players
Inner Mongolia Zhongyou F.C. players
Qingdao F.C. players
Association football wingers
21st-century Chinese people